The 2012 All-Ireland Minor Hurling Championship was the 82nd staging of the All-Ireland Minor Hurling Championship since its establishment by the Gaelic Athletic Association in 1928. The championship began on 21 April 2012 and ended on 30 September 2012.

Galway entered the championship as the defending champions, however, they were beaten by Tipperary in the All-Ireland semi-final.

On 30 September 2012, Tipperary won the championship following a 2-18 to 1-11 defeat of Dublin in a replay of the All-Ireland final. This was their 19th All-Ireland title and their first title since 2007. It was Tipperary and Dublin's first meeting in an All-Ireland final since 1954.

Clare's Bobby Duggan was the championship's top scorer with 3-49.

Results

Leinster Minor Hurling Championship

First round

Second round

Quarter-finals

Semi-finals

Final

Munster Minor Hurling Championship

Quarter-finals

Play-offs

Semi-finals

Final

Ulster Minor Hurling Championship

Quarter-finals

Semi-final

Finals

All-Ireland Minor Hurling Championship

Quarter-finals

Semi-finals

Final

Statistics

Top scorers

Top scorers overall

Top scorer in a single game

References

Minor
All-Ireland Minor Hurling Championship